Takla may refer to:

 Takla (name)
Takla Group, a group of volcanic rocks in British Columbia, Canada
Takla Formation, a geologic formation in British Columbia
Takla Lake, a lake in northern British Columbia, Canada
Takla Lake First Nation, a First Nation located around Takla Lake
Takla Landing Water Aerodrome, an aerodrome in northern British Columbia, Canada
Takla Narrows Aerodrome, an aerodrome in northern British Columbia, Canada